Stanley Lieberson (April 20, 1933 – March 19, 2018) was an American sociologist.

Born in Montreal, Quebec, Canada, Lieberson was raised in Brooklyn and graduated from Abraham Lincoln High School before attending Brooklyn College. Lieberson completed graduate study at the University of Chicago. He taught at Harvard University as the Abbott Lawrence Lowell Research Professor of Sociology. Over the course of his career, Lieberson was awarded a Guggenheim Fellowship, named a member of the National Academy of Sciences and the American Philosophical Society, granted fellowship to the American Academy of Arts and Sciences, and served the American Sociological Association as its president. He died on March 19, 2018.

References

1933 births
2018 deaths
American sociologists
Abraham Lincoln High School (Brooklyn) alumni
Brooklyn College alumni
Canadian emigrants to the United States
Fellows of the American Academy of Arts and Sciences
Harvard University faculty
Members of the American Philosophical Society
Members of the United States National Academy of Sciences
People from Brooklyn
Scientists from Montreal
Presidents of the American Sociological Association
Scientists from New York City
University of Chicago alumni